Markus Strøm Bay (17 February 1997) is a Danish professional footballer who plays as a midfielder for Fremad Amager in the Danish 1st Division.

Club career

Early years
Bay is a youth exponent from Brøndby IF, but in 2013 he transferred to the Ajax youth system. He signed a 3-year youth contract with the club. Bay started on the B1 team, and later joined the A1 team alongside Donny van de Beek and Abdelhak Nouri. After the winter break of that season he got injured in his groin. From that on, he was nearly out for 1.5 years with this injury, and wasn't ready until 2016. Bay revealed that it was a very bad period for him and he was close to retire due to this injury.

Jong Ajax
The midfielder was promoted to Jong Ajax in the summer 2016.

He made his debut with Jong Ajax on 19 August 2016 in an Eerste Divisie game against FC Den Bosch. He replaced Vince Gino Dekker in the 82nd minute, in a 5-2 home win.

However, Bay played 15 games for Jong Ajax in the 2016/17 season.

Viborg
On 8 August 2017, Bay signed with Danish Superliga club Viborg FF. Just a few weeks after joining the club, the manager who signed him, Johnny Mølby was fired. This resulted in Viborg FF changing their playing style to a style that did not match the creative midfielder.

Fremad Amager 
On 25 July 2018, Bay signed with Danish 1st Division club Fremad Amager. Markus Bay told the press that he was hoping to get a fresh start at Fremad Amager under the management of Jan Michaelsen. On 22 August 2018, Bay scored his first league goal for Fremad Amager against FC Roskilde.

References

1997 births
Living people
Danish men's footballers
Association football midfielders
AFC Ajax players
Jong Ajax players
Viborg FF players
Eerste Divisie players
Danish 1st Division players
People from Brøndby Municipality
Danish expatriate men's footballers
Brøndby IF players
Denmark youth international footballers
Expatriate footballers in the Netherlands
Danish expatriate sportspeople in the Netherlands
Fremad Amager players
Sportspeople from the Capital Region of Denmark